Changuillo District is one of five districts of the province Nazca in Peru.

References

1945 establishments in Peru
States and territories established in 1945